Toorak Art Gallery was an art gallery 277 Toorak Road, South Yarra, Melbourne, Victoria, which specialised in contemporary figurative and abstract Australian art. It was in operation from 1964 to 1975.

Exhibitions 
 1964, from August 9: Bezalel Academy of Arts and Design exhibition of painting and sculpture
 1964, 7–20 September: Young Australian contemporaries - painting, drawing and graphic art. Artists: Peter Wallace, Tony Cook, Sally Downley, Ken Leveson, John Fischer, Les Kossatz, John Brock, Tor Howlett, Connie Russo, John R. Wratten, John Stokes, Malcolm Ratten.
 1964: Third exhibition of Lithuanian artists in Australia, Melbourne. Artists: Vida Kabaila, Eva Kubbos, Vladas Meskenas, Nina Meskenas, Irena Pauliukonis, Eva Pocius, Vaclovas Ratas, Henry Salkauskas, Victoras Simankevicius, Algirdas Simkunas, Leonas Urbonas, Adolfas Vaicaitis, Adomis Vingis, Teisutis Zikaras, Leonas Zygas.
 1965, February: Alex Kosma
 196? Gerald Bland, John Bursill, Douglas Wright, Janet Body
 1967, June 28-July 22: Paintings and sculpture: John Adam, George Allen, Norm Affleck, William Aylward, Haslewood Ball,. Graham Chambers, Fred Coventry, Neil Douglas, Karl Duldig, Ludwik Dutkiewicz, Stella Dilger, Kevin English, Gerard Ebeli, William Frater, Patsy Foard, Jemima Fry, Peter Glass, Abigail Heathcote, Esther Harris, Louis James, David Keys, Norman Lindsay, Antoinette Mathieson, Karlis Mednis, Margaret Mezaks, Patrick O'Carrigan, Welsey Penberthy, Bernard Rust, Stephen Spurrier, Douglas Stubbs, Theo Shossau, Alan Sumner, Mario Telese, Wendy Thomas, Lorraine White, Mark Ward, Barbara Wales, Charles Wheeler, Ian Bow, Hermann Hohaus, Robert Langley, Lois Kuppers, Andor Meszaros.
 1968, March 5–25: Mixed exhibition: Arthur Boyd, Judy Cassab, Neil Douglas, Ludwik Dutkiewicz, Salvador Dali, Donald Friend, Leonard Hessing, Michael Kmit, Rodney Milgate, Keith Nichol, John Olsen, Krishna Reddy, Douglas Stubbs, Roland Wakelin.
 1968, October: Keith Nichols
 1969: 28 February-10 March: Moomba Festival exhibition
 1969, June 10–20: Mixed exhibition
 4 painters - Antoinette Mathieson, Elizabeth Prior, Joyce Thompson, Barbara Wales
 1970, 27 February-7 March: Moomba Festival exhibition
 1970: Frank Hinder
 1970, April 1–14:  Francis Lymburner 
 1970, June 21-July 4: Mid-year exhibition
 1970, February: Abigail, paintings
 1970, from 26 November: Exhibition of paintings. Artists: Christine Berkman, Ken Buckland, William Degan, Basil Hadley, Lesley Pockley, David Voigt.
 1970: Group show incl. Adolfas Jankus 
 1971, from July 27: Paintings & seriographs: Abigail, Henry Bell, Dora Cant, David Voigt, Salvatore Zofrea.* 1972, from April 28: Frank Auerbach
 1972, May 21-June 3: Exhibition of paintings by William Aylward, Kevin Lincoln, June Stephenson, Lilian Sutherland, John Winch
 1972, 11–24 June: Kit Barker, William Broker
 1972, from September 14: French painters of poetic realism. Artists: Yves Brayer, Christian Caillard, Joseph A. Muslin, Andre Planson, Maurice-Georges Poncelet, Roland Oudot, George Rohner.
 1972, July 2–15: July mixed exhibition: John Aland, David Armfield, Jamie Barker, Ken Buckland, Elizabeth Cummings, Lyndon Dadswell, Phillip Davis, Ross Davis, Shay Docking, Neil Douglas, William Frater, Robert Grieve, George Hodgkins, Julie Ingleby, Louis James, Michael Kmit, Eva Kubbos, Keith Nichol, Geoff O'Loughlin, Aina Nicmanis, Desiderius Orban, William Peascod, L. Pendlebury, Clifton Pugh, Henry Salkauskas, David Voigt, John Winch, Salvatore Zofrea, Reinis Zusters.
 1972, 15–28 October: Salvatore Zofrea solo show
 1973, September 3–18:  Liverpool +1 Jan Windus, Tony Kirkman, Noel Sheridan, John Fisher, Tim Burns, Mitch Johnson 
 1973, October: Lynch Prize for Painting
 1974, April: Barrie Goddard
 1974: Kevin Connor, solo
 1975, November 26–28: Artists for Labor and democracy - an exhibition of paintings, sculpture, drawings and prints
 1975: Barry Cleavin and Geofrey Brown, prints
 1975: Paul Greenaway
 1975: Stephen May

References

Modern art museums
Art museums and galleries in Melbourne
1964 establishments in Australia
1974 disestablishments in Australia
Art galleries established in 1964
Art galleries disestablished in 1974
History of Melbourne
Australian art